Radim Heřman (born April 13, 1991) is a Czech professional ice hockey forward. He is currently a free agent having last played for HC Tábor of the Czech 2.liga.

Heřman played two games with HC České Budějovice in the Czech Extraliga during the 2010–11 season.

References

External links

1991 births
Living people
BK Mladá Boleslav players
Czech ice hockey forwards
HC Tábor players
IHC Písek players
Motor České Budějovice players
SK Horácká Slavia Třebíč players
Czech expatriate ice hockey people
Czech expatriate sportspeople in France
Expatriate ice hockey players in France